Inga Petrovna Strelkova-Oboldina (born 23 December 1968) is a Russian theatre and film actress.

Biography 
Oboldina was born in the small Ural town of Kyshtym, into a family of engineers. After high school, she studied at the faculty of theatrical directing at the Institute of Culture and Art in Chelyabinsk. In the process of studying Inga Petrovna discovered her acting skills and started playing on stage. During the fourth course of study, Inga Oboldina married her classmate Garold Strelkov and took a double surname – Strelkova-Oboldina. After graduating from university with a red diploma, she remained at the institute to teach at the department of scenic speech. Two years later, she and her husband moved to Moscow. In Moscow, Strelkova-Oboldina entered the GITIS – (RATI) (workshop of Pyotr Fomenko). On November 6, 1996, she played in the premiere of Gerold Strelkov's play Sakhalin Wife at the recently opened Strelkov Theatre.

In 1998, Inga Strelkova-Oboldina was offered a role in the TV series Samozvantsy.

On 21 December 2012 she gave birth to a daughter, Clara, from the St. Petersburg actor and director Vitaly Saltykov.

Filmography

Theatre
 1996 - Sakhalin Wife (director G. Strelkov)
 1997 - Cold and Warmly, or Idea, Mr. House (director E. Nevezhina)
 1998 - Joan of Arc. Childhood (director G. Strelkov)
 1999 - Dali (director Yu Grymov)
 2000 - Joan of Arc. When the yard and in War (director G. Strelkov)
 2000 - Millionersha (director V. Mirzoev)
 2001 - Richard III (director G. Strelkov)
 2002 - Nachitalas! .. based on the script by A. Poyarkov and R. Khrushch (director G. Strelkov)
 2003 - Fantasies of Ivan Petrovich based on Alexander Pushkin's works (director G. Strelkov)
 2003 - The Cherry Orchard Chekhov (director E. Nyakroshyus, K. S. International Foundation and Meno Fortas)
 2004 - Mata Hari E. Greminoy (director G. Strelkov)
 2005 - All the People as M. Camoletti (director L. Trushkin)
 2006 - Shooting Down Rain A. Kureychik (director G. Strelkov)

Film 
 1998 - Samozvantsy (TV series)
 2001 - Sakhalin Wife
 2002 - Sky. Plane. Girl   (Melodrama) as  Myshka
 2003 - The French Guy   (Melodrama) as Tamara
 2003 - Spas under the birch   (TV series)
 2003 - Kill evening   (Melodrama)
 2004 - Children Arbata - (TV series)
 2004 - At Upper Maslovke   (Drama)
 2004 - Narrow Bridge   (TV series) as hairdresser
 2005 - Leningradets. CHuzhaja life   (Melodrama) as Zizi
 2005 - Kazus Kukotskogo (TV series)
 2005 - Doctor Zhivago   (TV series) as Shurochka Schlesinger
 2005 - The Case of "Dead Souls"   (TV series) as Marya Antonovna, the daughter of Governor
 2005 - Giving sale   (Lyric comedy)
 2006 - I was not hurt   (Melodrama)
 2006 - Volchitsa   (TV series) as Lydia Mikhaylovna Sapsay
 2006 - Ellipsis as Varvara
 2006 - Golden Calf   (Comedy) as Varvara Lokhankina
 2006 - Demons   (TV series)
 2007 - Detective Putilin   (TV series)
 2007 - The Will of Lenin (TV series) as Zoya Vershinina
 2007 - The Irony of Fate 2 as taxi driver
 2007 - Suzheny-ryazheny (TV) as Lera
 2008 - Native people   (TV series) as Sofya
 2008 - The long-awaited love
 2008 - Everybody Dies but Me as Zhanna's mother
 2011 - Wedding Exchange as  Vika
 2011 - Yolki 2 as Katya
 2012 - Detective Mom (TV series)
 2013 - Gagarin: First in Space as Adilya Kotovskaya
2013 - Balabol   (TV series) as Varvara Semyonovna Postysheva, Police Colonel
2014 - The new wife as Lika
2015 - Adult daughter  (TV series)  as Natalia
2015 - The theory of improbability as Alvina

Awards and nominations 
 Recipient of the festival "debuts in Moscow" in the category "Best Women's role" (Sakhalin Wife, 1996)
 Recipient of the First International Festival "The new drama" in the category "Best Women's role" (Nachitalas!..., 2001)
 Recipient of the International Stanislavsky prize in the category "Best Women's role" (The Cherry Orchard, 2003)
 Prize Laureate magazine Creativity in the nomination "creative actress Year" (The Cherry Orchard, 2003)
 Recipient of the festival performances of chamber "Golden Age" (Fantasies of Ivan Petrovich, 2004)
 Laureate Award "Triumph" (2004)

References

External links 
 

1968 births
Living people
People from Kyshtym
Russian film actresses
Russian television actresses
Russian stage actresses
Honored Artists of the Russian Federation
Russian Academy of Theatre Arts alumni